Gardner-White Furniture Company Inc. is an American furniture retailer. Founded in 1912, Gardner White Furniture Co. is based in Auburn Hills, Michigan.

It was founded by Eugene Clinton White and John G. Gardner. Irwin Kahn began working for the family-owned retailer in the mid-1950s and eventually became the second-generation owner and operator. 

The company had a single store until 1974 but has since expanded to 11 stores and a warehouse in southeastern Michigan. The company is one of the largest to partner with Best Buy and was the first furniture distributor in Michigan to bundle televisions and furniture together. In 2012, the company moved its corporate office and warehouse from Warren to Auburn Hills, Michigan into what was a Ryder warehouse.

References

External links

Companies based in Michigan
Furniture retailers of the United States
Retail companies established in 1912
Warren, Michigan
Auburn Hills, Michigan
1912 establishments in Michigan